The Chief Secretary Sindh, also referred to as CS Sindh, is the chief and highest-ranking official of the Government of Sindh. The appointment of the Chief Secretary is made by the Prime Minister of Pakistan. The position of Chief Secretary is equivalent to the rank of Federal Secretary and the position holder belongs to the Pakistan Administrative Service. The current Chief Secretary Sindh is Sohail Rajput, in office since 17 April 2022.

All Secretaries and Divisional Commissioners report to the Chief Secretary. Only the Prime Minister can appoint or remove the CS from his position. The Chief Secretary also serves as the Cabinet Secretary of Sindh.

Roles and powers of Chief Secretary 
The principal workplace of the Chief Secretary is the Chief Secretary's Office located in Sindh Secretariat (I). The official residence of the CS, is the Chief Secretary House, which also serves as a camp office.

It is pertinent to mention that the Chief Secretary heads the Secretaries' Committee.

List of Chief Secretaries
The following table lists down the names of Chief Secretaries that have remained in office since June 2000.

See also
 Federal Secretary
 Pakistan Administrative Service
 Cabinet Secretary of Pakistan
 Establishment Secretary of Pakistan
 Chief Secretary Punjab
 Chief Secretary (Pakistan)

References

Government of Sindh
Civil service of Pakistan